John Smeulders (born 28 March 1957) is an English retired professional footballer who played as a goalkeeper, best remembered for his three spells in the Football League with Bournemouth. He also played League football for Torquay United, Brentford and Peterborough United.

Club career 
A goalkeeper, Smeulders began his career as a youth with Orient. He was unable to displace the number 1 shirt from Ray Goddard and John Jackson and made just a handful of League Cup appearances before departing the Os in 1979. To revive his stalled career, Smeulders began the first of three spells with Bournemouth in July 1979. After failing to break into the first team, Smeulders dropped into non-League football in January 1981 with Trowbridge Town, moving on to Weymouth and then back to Bournemouth in January 1984. This time he did establish himself in the first team, making 75 league appearances, setting a then-club record seven consecutive clean sheets and being named the club's 1984–85 Player of the Year. Smeulders moved to Torquay United in July 1986, but after failing to hold down a first team place and spending time away from Plainmoor on loan, he returned to Bournemouth for the third time in August 1987. He again failed to hold down a regular place and dropped back into non-League football in 1989. Smeulders retired at age 38, due to a damaged knee.

Coaching career 
Smeulders later returned to Bournemouth as a coach to goalkeepers Neil Moss and Ian Andrews.

International career 
Smeulders won caps for England at youth level and played in the same team as Bryan Robson, Ray Wilkins, Glenn Hoddle and Peter Barnes.

Personal life 
As of March 1996, Smeulders was working in a bakery in Bournemouth. As of June 2020, he was living in Shaftesbury and working as a delivery driver for Waitrose and Riverford.

Career statistics

Honours 

 Bournemouth Player of the Year: 1984–85

References

1957 births
English footballers
English Football League players
Association football goalkeepers
Brentford F.C. players
Living people
Leyton Orient F.C. players
AFC Bournemouth players
Trowbridge Town F.C. players
Weymouth F.C. players
Torquay United F.C. players
Peterborough United F.C. players
Poole Town F.C. players
Farnborough F.C. players
Fareham Town F.C. players
Southern Football League players
Isthmian League players
National League (English football) players
England youth international footballers
AFC Bournemouth non-playing staff